The red five-toed skink (Leptosiaphos rhodurus) is a species of lizard in the family Scincidae. It is found in the Democratic Republic of the Congo.

References

Leptosiaphos
Reptiles described in 1951
Reptiles of the Democratic Republic of the Congo
Endemic fauna of the Democratic Republic of the Congo
Taxa named by Raymond Laurent